The Woman's Club of Morristown is a civic organization of Morristown, New Jersey. Its goal is to promote "community, civic, and cultural activities," as well as to preserve the 1797 Dr. Lewis Condict House, currently used as their Clubhouse.

Notable members included suffragist Alison Turnbull Hopkins and farmer and philanthropist Caroline Rose Foster.

In 2003, the National Park Service listed the Club in "Properties Associated with the Women's Rights Movement" as part of a Women's Rights National History Trail Feasibility Study.

History 
Established in 1910, the Club was initially titled the Woman's Town Improvement Committee. Part of its goals aligned with the City Beautiful movement. 

In 1912, the Club allied with the all-male Civic Association of Morristown to demand better conditions for the Maple Avenue School, after hearing about its abysmal state, overcrowding, and "vital fire danger." The two groups collaborated to demand that the Board of Education rectify the Maple Avenue School's condition as well as constructing a new school. The Club's leader, Mrs. W. W. Cutler, insisted that a new school was necessary. Editorials about the situation were printed in The Jerseyman as well as its political opposite, True Democratic Banner. After years of debate and referendums, the construction of the new school was approved in 1916; construction began in September 1916 and the new, comparatively spacious Morristown High School was open to students by September 4, 1918.

By 1923, the Club was renamed Morristown Woman's Civic Organization, and it was printed in the Annual Register of Women's Clubs and National Organizations in America. Its President was identified "Mrs. James L. Dexter"; the President's own name is not stated. At the time, the Club was headquartered at 87 Early Street in Morristown.

In 1928, Railway Age reported that the Club (specifically Mrs. D. F. Barkman) were on a Committee supporting D. L. & W. Railroad's railway electrification, which would greatly improve thousands of New Jerseyan's commutes. The lines in question were Hoboken to Dover via Morristown; Passaic & Delaware branch to Gladstone; and the Montclair branch. The cost was estimated to be US$14,000,000–US$18,000,000. The Committee was successful and the entire project was completed on January 11, 1931.

In 1937, the Club purchased the Dr. Lewis Condict House, a "five-bay, Federal-style clapboard house" constructed in 1797. The house was declared a New Jersey Historic Site in 1971, and in 1973 it was placed on the National Register of Historic Places.

In 1964, the Club held roundtable discussions open to the public about how to combat drug abuse. These presentations led to the 1965 creation of the Committee for Narcotics Preventions of Morris County, led by Anne Louise Sando McGee Groome. Around this time, Sears Roebuck awarded the Club as part of its Community Improvement Contest, specifically for Groome's work in the field of drug abuse.

Philanthropy and events 
On April 11, 2021, the Club organized a drive-through charity donation event, in which donors were encouraged to drop off supplies to aid the local homeless population. Supplies included underwear, Walmart and Shoprite gift cards, socks, toiletries, and backpacks. 

In November 2021, the Club hosted a Holiday Boutique as a fundraiser.

Each year, the Club grants US$2,000 scholarships to 3 students graduating Morristown High School. The winners are chosen based on scholastic achievement, leadership, and community service.

Throughout the seasons, Club hosts a flea market, rummage sales, and a Holiday Boutique to fundraise for local charities and preservation of the Lewis Condit house. All three of these types of event are being hosted in 2022.

Notable members 

 Alison Turnbull Hopkins, suffrage activist
 Caroline Rose Foster, farmer and philanthropist

See also 

 History of New Jersey

 Women's club movement in the United States
 Women's rights

References 

Morristown, New Jersey
Civic organizations
Women's clubs in the United States
Women's rights organizations
Philanthropic organizations
Women in New Jersey